Vladimir Spiridonovich Gigauri (b. 10 April 1934 in Tbilisi - d. 04 Feb 2006 in Moscow) was a renowned Georgian-born Soviet scientist in the fields of medicine, biomedical engineering, military, and space. 

Professor V. Gigauri is best known for his needle-free jet injector, breathing apparatus used in space and conducting the first artificial heart implant in the Soviet Union (on a calf). 

He was the head of the Soviet Experimental Surgery Department (part of USSR Academy of Medical Sciences) and member of the Russian Academy of Cosmonautics. He is a laureate of two State Prizes in the areas of science and technology, author of numerous publications and over 200 patented inventions.

External links 
Select Bibliography:

References 

Soviet surgeons
Russian surgeons
Scientists from Georgia (country)
1934 births
2006 deaths